The 2000 Stan James World Matchplay was a darts tournament held in the Empress Ballroom at the Winter Gardens, Blackpool. This was the first World Matchplay tournament to be sponsored by UK bookmaker Stan James.

The tournament ran from 23 to 29 July 2000, and was won by Phil Taylor.

Paul Lim Had to pull out of this tournament due to visa issues his place was taken by Alex Roy, The opening night of action was not televised by Sky Sports

Prize money
The prize fund was £58,000.

Seeds

Results

References

World Matchplay (darts)
World Matchplay Darts